General elections were held in the Dominican Republic on 16 May 1994. Joaquín Balaguer of the Social Christian Reformist Party won the presidential election, whilst the Dominican Revolutionary Party-led alliance won the Congressional elections. Voter turnout was 87.6%.

Despite reforms after the 1990 elections, including a new electoral roll, these elections were also branded fraudulent. Following the election an agreement known as the Pact for Democracy (Pacto por la Democracia) was reached, which shortened the presidential term to two years, allowing new elections to be held in 1996 in which Balaguer would not run (for the first time since 1966).

Results

President

Congress

References

Dominican Republic
1994 in the Dominican Republic
Elections in the Dominican Republic
Presidential elections in the Dominican Republic
Election and referendum articles with incomplete results
May 1994 events in North America